January 8 – December 13: 2015 ITTF Calendar of Events

World cups, championships, and test event

 January 8–11: World Team Cup in  Dubai
 Men:  (Fan Zhendong, Zhang Jike, Xu Xin)
 Women:  (Liu Shiwen, Zhu Yuling, Ding Ning)
 April 26 – May 3: 2015 World Table Tennis Championships in  Suzhou
 Men's singles:  Ma Long
 Men's doubles:  Xu Xin / Zhang Jike
 Women's singles:  Ding Ning
 Women's doubles:  Liu Shiwen / Zhu Yuling
 Mixed doubles:  Xu Xin /  Yang Ha-eun
 October 16–18: Men's World Cup in  Halmstad
 Winner:  Ma Long
 October 23–31: 2015 World Cadet Challenge in  Sharm el-Sheikh
 Boys' singles:  YANG Shuo
 Boys' doubles:  Koyo Kanamitsu /  YANG Shuo
 Girls' singles:  Bruna Takahashi
 Girls' doubles:  CHOI Hae-eun /  Maki Shiomi
 Mixed doubles:  Truls Moregard /  Adriana Diaz
 Boys' team winners: Team Europe (Cristian Pletea, Medardas Stankevicius, Truls Moregard)
 Girls' team winners: Team Latin America (Adriana Diaz, Bruna Takahashi, Esmerlyn Castro)
 October 30 – November 1: Women's World Cup in  Sendai
 Winner:  Liu Shiwen
 Men's singles:  Paul Drinkhall
 Women's singles:  Lin Gui
 November 29 – December 6: 2015 World Junior Table Tennis Championships in  Vendée
  won all the gold medals and won the overall medal tally, too.

Continental TT championships

 January 23–29: 2015 African Table Tennis Championships in  Cairo
 Men's singles:  Omar Assar
 Women's singles:  Dina Meshref
 Men's doubles:  Makanjuola Kazeem / Quadri Aruna
 Women's doubles:  Han Xing / Onyinyechi Nwachukwu
 Mixed doubles:  Omar Assar / Dina Meshref
 Men's team:  (El-sayed Lashin, Omar Assar, Ahmed Saleh)
 Women's team:  (Nadeen El-Dawlatly, Dina Meshref, Yousra Helmy)
 February 6–8: 2015 European Top 16 Cup in  Baku
 Men's winner:  Dimitrij Ovtcharov
 Women's winner:  Liu Jia
 March 13–15: 2015 Asian Cup Table Tennis Tournament in  Jaipur
 Men's winner:  Xu Xin
 Women's winner:  Feng Tianwei
 March 16–24: 2015 Latin American Table Tennis Championships in  Buenos Aires
 Men's singles:  Hugo Calderano
 Women's singles:  Gui Lin
 Men's doubles:  Manuel Moya / Alejandro Rodríguez
 Women's doubles:  Gui Lin / Lígia Silva
 Mixed doubles:  Marcos Madrid / Yadira Silva
 Men's team winners:  (Hugo Calderano, Cazuo Matsumoto, Thiago Monteiro)
 Women's team winners:  (Lígia Silva, Jessica Yamada, Gui Lin)
 April 8–12: 2015 African Junior and Cadet Championships in  Beau-Bassin Rose-Hill
 Junior
 Men's junior singles winner:  Aly Ghallab
 Women's junior singles winner:  Amira Yousry
 Men's junior doubles winners:  Aly Ghallab / Karim Elhakem
 Women's junior doubles winners:  Reem Morad / Amira Yousry
 Mixed junior doubles winners:  Aly Ghallab / Reem Morad
 Men's junior team winners:  (Aly Ghallab, Karim Elhakem, Omar Elhamady)
 Women's junior team winners:  (Lynda Loghraibi, Sannah Lagsir, Hiba Feredj)
 Cadet
 Men's cadet singles winner:  Youssef Abdel-Aziz
 Women's cadet singles winner:  Marwa Alhodaby
 Men's cadet team winners:  (Youssef Abdel-Aziz and Marwan Abdelwahab)
 Women's cadet team winners:  (Marwa and Mariam Alhodaby)
 April 10–12: 2015 ITTF-Oceania Cup in  Bendigo
 Oceania Cup
 Men's singles winner:  William Henzell
 Women's singles winner:  Lay Jian Fang
 Pacific Cup
 Men's singles winner:  Laurent Sens
 Women's singles winner:  Ornella Bouteille
 May 13–16: 2015 Oceania Cadet and Junior Championships in  Tarawa
 Junior
 Men's junior singles winner:  Jake Duffy
 Men's junior doubles winners:  Dillon Chambers / Jake Duffy
 Women's junior singles winner:  Rebekah Stanley
 Women's junior doubles winners:  CHENG Zhiying / VONG Hui-Ling
 Mixed junior doubles winners:  Jake Duffy / Rebekah Stanley
 Men's junior team winners:  (Dillon Chambers, Jake Duffy, Rohan Dhooria)
 Women's junior team winners:  (Katherine Li, Rebekah Stanley, Georgina Newton)
 Cadet
 Men's cadet singles winner:  Benjamin Gould
 Men's cadet doubles winners:  Kevin Lin / ZHAO Yang Lun
 Women's cadet singles winner:  VONG Hui-Ling
 Women's cadet doubles winners:  CHENG Zhiying / VONG Hui-Ling
 Mixed cadet doubles winners:  ZHAO Yang Lun / VONG Hui-Ling
 Men's cadet team winners:  (Kevin Lin, and ZHAO Yang Lun)
 Women's cadet team winners:  (Rebekah Stanley, Katherine Li, Georgina Newton)
 May 15–17: 2015 North America Cup in  Markham, Ontario
 Men's winner:  Jimmy Butler
 Women's winner:  Zhang Mo
 May 29–31: 2015 Latin American Table Tennis Cup in  Havana
 Men's winner:  Gustavo Tsuboi
 Women's winner:  Caroline Kumahara
 June 23–28: 2015 Latin American Junior and Cadet Championships in  Aguada, Puerto Rico
 Junior
 Junior boys' singles winner:  Brian Afanador
 Junior boys' doubles winners:  Brian Afanador / Yomar Gonzalez
 Junior girls' singles winner:  Leticia Nakada
 Junior girls' doubles winners:  Leticia Nakada / Alexia Nakashima
 Junior mixed doubles winners:  Vitor Santos / Alexia Nakashima
 Junior boys' team winners: 
 Junior girls' team winners: 
 Cadet
 Cadet boys' singles winner:  Guilherme Teodoro
 Cadet boys' doubles winners:  Rafael Torino / Guilherme Teodoro
 Cadet Girls' Singles winner:  Bruna Takahashi
 Cadet girls' doubles winners:  Adriana Diaz / Lineris Rivera
 Cadet mixed doubles winners:  Francisco Matias / Adriana Diaz
 Cadet boys' team winners: 
 Cadet girls' team winners: 
 July 10–19: 2015 European Youth Championships in  Bratislava
 Junior boys' singles winner:  Anton Kallberg
 Junior boys' doubles winner:  Darko Jorgic / Deni Kozul
 Junior girls' singles winner:  Adina Diaconu
 Junior girls' doubles winners:  Maria Malanina / Daria Chernoray
 Junior mixed doubles winners:  Alexandru Manole / Andreea Clapa
 Cadet boys' singles winner:  Cristian Pletea
 Cadet boys' doubles winners:  Irvin Bertrand / Lilian Bardet
 Cadet girls' singles winner:  Maria Taylakova
 Cadet girls' doubles winners:  Ema Marn / Andrea Pavlovic
 Cadet mixed doubles winners:  Cristian Pletea /  Maria Taylakova
 July 21–23: 2015 Africa Cup, TOP16, in  Yaoundé
 Men's winner:  Omar Assar
 Women's winner:  Dina Meshref
 July 22–26: 2015 Asian Junior and cadet Championships in  Kuala Lumpur
 Junior:  won all the gold medals available and won the overall medal tally, too.
 Cadet: China won all the gold medals available and won the overall medal tally, too.
 September 5–7: 2015 North American Table Tennis Championships in  Westchester County, New York
 Men's winner:  Timothy Wang
 Women's winner:  Lily Zhang
 Cadet boys' singles winner:  Jack Wang
 Cadet girls' singles winner:  Crystal Wang
 Men's team winners:  (Jimmy Butler, Timothy Wang, Kanak Jha)
 Women's team winners:  (Lily Zhang, Judy Hugh, Amy Wang)
 Junior men's team winners:  (Jack Wang, Kanak Jha, Krishnateja Avvari)
 Junior women's team winners:  (Prachi Jha, Crystal Wang, Amy Wang)
 September 25 – October 4: 2015 European Table Tennis Championships in  Yekaterinburg
 Men's singles winner:  Dimitrij Ovtcharov
 Women's singles winner:  Elizabeta Samara
 Men's doubles winners:  Stefan Fegerl /  João Monteiro
 Women's doubles winners:  Melek Hu /  Shen Yanfei
 September 26 – October 3: 2015 Asian Table Tennis Championships in  Pattaya
 Men's singles winner:  Fan Zhendong
 Women's singles winner:  Zhu Yuling
 Men's doubles winners:  Fan Zhendong / Xu Xin
 Women's doubles winners:  Kim Hye Song / Ri Mi-gyong
 Mixed doubles winners:  Fan Zhendong / Chen Meng
 Men's team winners:  (Xu Xin, Fan Zhendong, Zhang Jike)
 Women's team winners:  (Zhu Yuling, Ding Ning, Chen Meng)
 October 16–18: 2015 Europe Youth Top-10 in  Buzău
 For information, click here.

ITTF World Tour

 January 28 – November 15: 2015 ITTF World Tour
 January 28 – February 1: Hungarian Open in  Budapest
 Men's singles:  Jiang Tianyi
 Women's singles:  Misako Wakamiya
 Men's doubles:  Jeong Sang-eun / Lee Sang-su
 Women's doubles:  Sofia Polcanova / Amelie Solja
 February 11–15: Kuwait Open in  Kuwait City
Men's singles:  Ma Long
 Women's singles:  Li Xiaoxia
 Men's doubles:  Chiang Hung-Chieh / Huang Sheng-Shyan
 Women's doubles:  Ding Ning / Zhu Yuling
 February 17–22: Qatar Open in  Doha
 Men's singles:  Vladimir Samsonov
 Women's singles:  Elizabeta Samara
 Men's doubles:  Marcos Freitas /  Andrej Gaćina
 Women's doubles:  Jiang Huajun / Tie Ya Na
 March 10–14: Nigeria Open in  Lagos
 Men's singles:  Omar Assar
 Women's singles:  Jieni Shao
 Men's doubles:  Quadri Aruna / Kazeem Makanjuola
 Women's doubles:  Dina Meshref /  Jieni Shao
 March 18–22: German Open in  Bremen
 Men's singles:  Ma Long
 Women's singles:  Mima Ito
 Men's doubles:  Timo Boll / Patrick Franziska
 Women's doubles:  Shan Xiaona / Petrissa Solja
 March 25–29: Spanish Open in  Almería
 Men's singles:  Maharu Yoshimura
 Women's singles:  JEON Ji-hee
 Men's doubles:  He Zhi Wen / Carlos Machado
 Women's doubles:  Ai Fukuhara / Misako Wakamiya
 May 13–17: Belarus Open in  Minsk
 Men's singles:  Li Ping
 Women's singles:  Mima Ito
 Men's doubles:  Jonathan Groth / Kasper Sternberg
 Women's doubles:  Miyu Maeda / Mori Sakura
 May 19–23: Croatia Open in  Zagreb
 Men's singles:  Maharu Yoshimura
 Women's singles:  CHOI Hyo-joo
 Men's doubles:  Masataka Morizono / Yuya Oshima
 Women's doubles:  JEON Ji-hee / Yang Ha-eun
 May 27–31: Philippines Open in  Subic, Zambales
 Men's singles:  Yuya Oshima
 Women's singles:  Kasumi Ishikawa
 Men's doubles:  Robin Devos / Cedric Nuytinck
 Women's doubles:  LEE Ho Ching / ZHU Chengzhu
 June 3–7: Australian Open in  Gold Coast
 Men's singles:  Jung Young-sik
 Women's singles:  Ai Fukuhara
 Men's doubles:   HO Kwan Kit / LAM Siu Hang
 Women's doubles:  JEON Ji-hee / LEE Da-som
 June 24–28: Japan Open in  Kobe
 Men's singles:  Xu Xin
 Women's singles:  Chen Meng
 Men's doubles:  Ma Long / Xu Xin
 Women's doubles:  LIU Fei / Wu Yang
 July 1–5: Korea Open in  Incheon
 Men's singles:  Jung Young-sik
 Women's singles:  Ai Fukuhara
 Men's doubles:  Jung Young-sik / Kim Min-seok
 Women's doubles:  Miu Hirano / Mima Ito
 July 29 – August 2: Pyongyang Open in 
 Men's singles:  CHOE Il
 Women's singles:  SUN Chen
 Men's doubles:  CHOE Il / PAK Sin Hyok
 Women's doubles:  KIM Song I / Ri Myong-sun
 August 5–9: China Open in  Chengdu
 Men's singles:  Ma Long
 Women's singles:  Zhu Yuling
 Men's doubles:  Fan Zhendong / Xu Xin
 Women's doubles:  Chen Meng / Liu Shiwen
 August 19–23: Bulgaria Open in  Panagyurishte
 Men's singles:  KIM Dong-hyun
 Women's singles:  Kasumi Ishikawa
 Men's doubles:  CHO Eon-rae / KIM Dong-hyun
 Women's doubles:  JEON Ji-hee / YANG Ha-eun
 August 26–30: Czech Open in  Olomouc
 Men's singles:  Wong Chun Ting
 Women's singles:  Ai Fukuhara
 Men's doubles:  Pär Gerell / Jon Persson
 Women's doubles:  JEON Ji-hee / YANG Ha-eun
 September 2–6: Austrian Open in  Wels
 Men's singles:  Jun Mizutani
 Women's singles:  Han Ying
 Men's doubles:  JANG Woo-jin / Lee Sang-su
 Women's doubles:  SHAN Xiaona / Petrissa Solja
 September 9–12: Belgium Open in  De Haan
 Men's singles:  Nima Alamian
 Women's singles:  SEO Hyo-won
 Men's doubles:  Nima Alamian / Noshad Alamian
 Women's doubles:  Lin Ye / Zhou Yihan
 September 16–20: Argentina Open in  Mendoza, Argentina
 Men's singles:  Eric Jouti
 Women's singles:  JEON Ji-hee
 Men's doubles:  Gaston Alto / Pablo Tabachnik
 Women's doubles:  JEON Ji-hee / YANG Ha-eun
 September 23–27: Chile Open in  Santiago
 Men's singles:  Thiago Monteiro
 Women's singles:  JEON Ji-hee
 Men's doubles:  Gustavo Gómez / Manuel Moya
 Women's doubles:  Leticia Nakada / Bruna Takahashi
 October 21–25: Poland Open in  Warsaw
 Men's singles:  Fan Zhendong
 Women's singles:  Liu Shiwen
 Men's doubles:  Kristian Karlsson / Mattias Karlsson
 Women's doubles:  Ding Ning / Zhu Yuling
 November 4–8: Russia Open in  Yekaterinburg
 Event cancelled
 November 11–15: Swedish Open in  Stockholm
 Men's singles:  Fan Zhendong
 Women's singles:  Mu Zi
 Men's doubles:  Fang Bo / Xu Xin
 Women's doubles:  Chen Meng / Mu Zi
 December 10–13: 2015 ITTF World Tour Grand Finals in  Lisbon
 Men's singles:  Ma Long
 Women's singles:  Ding Ning
 Men's doubles:  Masataka Morizono / Yuya Oshima
 Women's doubles:  Ding Ning / Zhu Yuling

Para table tennis

 March 12 – December 19: 2015 ITTF Para Table Tennis Calendar of Events
 Note: The French Open, slated for June 17–21 in Nantes, was cancelled.
 March 12–16: Hungarian Open in  Eger
  won both the gold and overall medal tallies.
 March 17–22: Italian Open in  Lignano Sabbiadoro
  won the gold medal tally.  won the overall medal tally.
 April 6–13: 2015 Oceania Para Regional Championships in  Bendigo
  won both the gold and overall medal tallies.
 May 5–10: Slovenian Open in  Laško
  won the gold medal tally. Ukraine, and  had a score of 13.5 each in the overall medal tally.
 May 12–17: Slovakian Open in  Bratislava
  won both the gold and overall medal tallies.
 May 26–31: Bayreuth Open in 
  won both the gold and overall medal tallies.
 June 17–21: Para Table Tennis Open Ciutat del Prat in  El Prat de Llobregat
  won both the gold and overall medal tallies.
 June 24–28: Romania International Table Tennis Open in  Cluj-Napoca
  won the gold medal tally.  won the overall medal tally.
 July 24–27: Thailand Open 2015 in  Pattaya
  won both the gold and overall medal tallies.
 August 7–14: Part of the 2015 Parapan American Games in  Toronto
  won both the gold and overall medal tallies.
 August 22–24: Taichung Table Tennis Open for the Disabled 2015 in 
  won the gold medal tally.  won the overall medal tally. 
 September 3–6: 2015 Korea PTT Open in  Ulsan
  won both the gold and overall medal tallies.
 September 22–27: Czech Open 2015 in  Ostrava
  won both the gold and overall medal tallies.
 October 5–7: 1st Morocco Para TT Open 2015 in  Agadir
  won the gold medal tally.  won the overall medal tally.
 October 7–11: African Championships 2015 in  Agadir
  won both the gold and overall medal tallies.
 October 12–18: 2015 European Regional Championships in  Vejle
  won the gold medal tally.  won the overall medal tally.
 October 17–22: Al Watani Championship in  Amman
  won both the gold and overall medal tallies.
 October 22–29: 2015 Asia Regional Championships in  Amman
  won both the gold and overall medal tallies.
 October 30 – November 3: Belgium Open in  Sint-Niklaas
  won the gold medal tally.  won the overall medal tally.
 November 5–9: Copa Tango XIII in  Buenos Aires
  and  won 3 gold medals each.  won the overall medal tally.
 November 13–15: Copa Chile in  Santiago
  won both the gold and overall medal tallies.
 November 19–25: China Open in  Beijing
  won both the gold and overall medal tallies.
 December 16–19: Copa Costa Rica in  San José, Costa Rica
  and  won 4 gold medals each. France won the overall medal tally.

References

 
Table tennis by year
Table Tennis